The Cape May County Park & Zoo in Cape May Court House, New Jersey, provides free year-round admission to a collection of more than 550 animals representing 250 species in  of exhibits. The zoo began operation in 1978. Its principal exhibit areas are a  African Savanna, a free-flight aviary, and a reptile collection. In addition to the Zoo and Park Central, there is also Park East, Park North and Park South.

The zoo is open every day except for Christmas, weather permitting. The hours of operation are from 10:00 am until 3:30pm in the winter and 10:00am until 4:30pm in the summer. Time changes occur with daylight saving time. The zoo also has a train ride and carousel. The train is trackless and can take visitors all around the zoo. The carousel has zoo animals for riding seats unlike the traditional horses on most carousels.

Cape May County Zoological Society/ZooFriends, a 501(c)3 non-profit NJ corporation, is the official Support Organization of the Cape May County Park & Zoo. Since 1986 the Society has continuously provided the private sector funding needed to develop new exhibits, improve facilities, purchase zoo equipment and make acquisitions for the animal collection. The Society makes significant contributions to conservation and endeavors to encourage the community's interest and enjoyment of the Zoo.

History

In 1942, a  area of wooded land, formerly a plantation owned by the Matthews family, was donated to Cape May County. The area later housed the 4-H fair. In 1967, the Cape May Park Commission was established to maintain the county's parks. In 1978, the Cape May County Park & Zoo was created within Park Central.

In the February 5–6, 2010 North American blizzard, the enclosure of the bald eagle habitat was destroyed by the heavy snow fall. It has since been rebuilt.

The Walter Trettin Snow Leopard Habitat was completed in 2016.

Reputation
The zoo was voted the 13th best zoo in the world and the 5th best zoo in the United States in TripAdvisor's Traveler's Choice 2015. TripAdvisor also named the zoo the 3rd best in the nation in 2012.

Conservation
The zoo is accredited by the Association of Zoos and Aquariums (AZA), and participates in a number of its species survival programs. In particular, a Mountain Bongo Antelope from the zoo's collection was sent to the Mount Kenya World Heritage Site in 2004 to join a captive breeding population intended to reestablish a wild population in future generations.

On May 10, 2010, the Cape May County Zoo welcomed two snow leopard cubs born to parents Himani and Vijay. They are the first snow leopard cubs born at the zoo and the first cubs for mother ‘Himani’. Only eleven snow leopards were born and survived last year in the United States. The two male cubs, Kaba and Sabu are part of the Association of Zoos & Aquariums (AZA) Species Survival Plan (SSP) Program. The mission of an AZA SSP Program is to cooperatively manage specific, and typically threatened or endangered species populations within AZA-accredited Zoos and Aquariums. Kaba now resides at the Seneca Park Zoo in Rochester and Sabu is at the Brookfield Zoo in Chicago.

Notes

External links

Zoological Society website

1978 establishments in New Jersey
Buildings and structures in Cape May County, New Jersey
Middle Township, New Jersey
Parks in Cape May County, New Jersey
Zoos in New Jersey
County parks in New Jersey